On 9 April 2011, six people were killed by a gunman who entered the Ridderhof mall in Alphen aan den Rijn, Netherlands, a town approximately  south-west of Amsterdam. Using a rifle, 24-year-old Tristan van der Vlis shot several people and then killed himself, reportedly with a different firearm. There were seven deaths, including the killer, and 17 wounded, making it the deadliest attack in the Netherlands since the 2009 attack on the Dutch royal family.

Shooting
Van der Vlis, wearing a bulletproof vest and armed with a semi-automatic Smith & Wesson M&P15-22, a stainless steel Colt M1911 .45-caliber pistol, and a Taurus Raging Bull .44 Magnum revolver, first got out of his car and shot a person outside, then entered the Ridderhof mall and fired more than 100 rounds, killing six people and injuring another 17 before he took a pistol, and took his own life. Many shoppers in the centre panicked before it was evacuated and cordoned off. Later that day one of the injured victims died from their injuries, raising the total number of deceased to seven. The gunman had left a note in his car stating that explosives had been left in three malls in the city; these malls were subsequently evacuated. Children were among the victims, but they had had only mild injuries. Among the dead were three males aged 80, 49 and 42, and three females aged 91, 68 and 45. The first victim was a poet and journalist from Syria who had escaped an assassination attempt, only to be killed by Van der Vlis after fleeing from his home country to the Netherlands. This was a random killing, as Van der Vlis shot at his victims indiscriminately.

Perpetrator

The shooter was 24-year-old Tristan van der Vlis  who lived in an apartment complex in Alphen aan den Rijn with his parents. He had lived in Alphen since his childhood. According to the police, he was a member of a shooting association and possessed three firearms. He had a history of psychological and psychiatric problems, including paranoid schizophrenia; in 2006 he spent 10 days in a closed institution after attempting suicide. He wanted to punish God by murdering "his creatures".

Van der Vlis was obsessed with the 1999 Columbine High School massacre and chose the date of 9 April because it was the birthday of gunman Eric Harris, his 30th birthday had he survived. Van der Vlis started shooting at 12:08 pm because that was the time when Harris committed suicide.

Van der Vlis was the grandson of Hennaarderadeel and Franeker mayor Kornelis van der Vlis, who was a member of the National Socialist Movement during World War II. He was also the nephew of former Dutch General Arie van der Vlis, who also served as the Chief of the Defence Staff from 1992 to 1994.

Casualties
Ali van Doorn (91)
Frans Deutekom (80)
Margriet ter Haar (68)
Michael Boezaard (49)
Constanze Boezaard-Bierman (45)
Nadim Youssef (42)

Response

The Netherlands Government Information Service, through a brief statement on Twitter, said Queen Beatrix was "speechless because of the great loss and sadness;" and politicians such as Minister of Security and Justice Ivo Opstelten expressed feelings of shock and tragedy.

Several thousand people attended a memorial service at the mall on 10 April. Prime Minister Mark Rutte, Minister Opstelten and acting Mayor of Alphen aan den Rijn Bas Eenhoorn were also present.

Copycat threats
Shortly after the shooting, police arrested a 17-year-old boy who threatened to carry out another mass shooting. The teenager from Rotterdam posted on Twitter:

After a backlash, the boy deleted the post and claimed it was a joke. Since then, four other people were arrested for making similar threats on Twitter.

Aftermath
On 20 September 2019, the Supreme Court of the Netherlands (Hoge Raad) concluded that the police of Alphen aan den Rijn was at fault for distributing a firearms license to the perpetrator who obviously had a mental illness. Therefore, the police were held accountable for all damages suffered by the victims and their relatives. After the shooting the police in the Netherlands had a surge of revoked licences and currently maintain a stricter enforcement of law regarding the possession of firearms.

See also
Utrecht tram shooting

References

Attacks in Europe in 2011
Alphen aan den Rijn
Deaths by firearm in the Netherlands
Murder–suicides in Europe
Mass murder in 2011
Mass murder in the Netherlands
Suicides by firearm in the Netherlands
Mass shootings in the Netherlands
Attacks on shopping malls
April 2011 events in Europe
2011 murders in the Netherlands
2011 mass shootings in Europe
Columbine High School massacre copycat crimes